Menggong may refer to:

Menggong, Hunan (孟公), a town in Xinhua County, Hunan, China
Menggong Township (蒙公乡), a township in Qintang District, Guigang, Guangxi, China